Vincent A. Riccio (July 27, 1919 – February 14, 1985) was an American politician who served in the New York State Assembly from the 51st district from 1969 to 1974 and in the New York City Council from the Brooklyn at-large district from 1978 to 1981.

He died of a heart attack on February 14, 1985, in Miami, Florida at age 65.

References

1919 births
1985 deaths
Republican Party members of the New York State Assembly
New York City Council members
20th-century American politicians